Myrmoteras is a genus of ants in the subfamily Formicinae and the sole member of the tribe Myrmoteratini. They have enormous eyes, a character found in other ancient genera, and extremely elongated mandibles with eight to 16 teeth. These work as trap-jaws and can open up to 270°.

Description

While the elongated mandibles look superficially similar to those of the basal Myrmecia, the mechanism is, as a whole, totally dissimilar and is rather convergent to that of the ponerine genera Anochetus and Odontomachus, and the myrmicine Strumigenys. The trigger mechanism of the trap-jaw-like mandibles of Myrmoteras consists of two hairs. Other trap-jawed genera are Daceton, Acanthognathus, Orectognathus, Microdaceton, and Epitritus.

Distribution
Myrmoteras occurs in the Indo-Malayan region.

Species

Myrmoteras arcoelinae Agosti, 1992
Myrmoteras bakeri Wheeler, 1919 — Borneo
Myrmoteras barbouri Creighton, 1930 — Java
Myrmoteras baslerorum Agosti, 1992
Myrmoteras binghamii Forel, 1893 — Burma
Myrmoteras brachygnathum Moffett, 1985
Myrmoteras brigitteae Agosti, 1992
Myrmoteras ceylonicum Gregg, 1957 — Sri Lanka
Myrmoteras chondrogastrum Moffett, 1985
Myrmoteras concolor Bui, Eguchi & Yamane, 2013
Myrmoteras cuneonodum Xu, 1998
Myrmoteras danieli Agosti, 1992
Myrmoteras diastematum Moffett, 1985
Myrmoteras donisthorpei Wheeler, 1916 — Borneo
Myrmoteras elfeorum Agosti, 1992
Myrmoteras estrudae Agosti, 1992
Myrmoteras glabrum Zettel & Sorger, 2011
Myrmoteras indicum Moffett, 1985
Myrmoteras insulcatum Moffett, 1985
Myrmoteras iriodum Moffett, 1985
Myrmoteras ivani Agosti, 1992
Myrmoteras jacquelinae Agosti, 1992
Myrmoteras jaitrongi Bui, Eguchi & Yamane, 2013
Myrmoteras karnyi Gregg, 1954
Myrmoteras marianneae Agosti, 1992
Myrmoteras maudeae Agosti, 1992
Myrmoteras mcarthuri Zettel & Sorger, 2011
Myrmoteras mjoebergi Creighton, 1930 — Borneo
Myrmoteras morowali Moffett, 1985
Myrmoteras namphuong Bui, Eguchi & Yamane, 2013
Myrmoteras nicoletteae Agosti, 1992
Myrmoteras opalinum Bui, Eguchi & Yamane, 2013
Myrmoteras scabrum Moffett, 1985
Myrmoteras susanneae Agosti, 1992
Myrmoteras tomimasai Bui, Eguchi & Yamane, 2013
Myrmoteras tonboli Agosti, 1992
Myrmoteras toro Moffett, 1985
Myrmoteras williamsi Wheeler, 1919 — Philippines
Myrmoteras wolasi Moffett, 1985

References

External links

Formicinae
Ant genera